Henrique de Menezes was a politician from Portugal who served as Governor-General of Portuguese India from 1521 to 1524. On 21 February 1526, he died in Cannanore district. He was the nephew of Diogo Lopes de Sequeira.

References 

Governors-General of Portuguese India
1526 deaths